Aegilops kotschyi (syn.  Aegilops triuncialis var. kotschyi L. (Boiss.) Boiss., Aegilops triuncialis ssp. kotschyi (Boiss.) Zhuk., Aegilops geniculata Fig. & De Not. nom, Aegilops variabilis Eig, Triticum kotschyi (Boiss.) Bowden, Triticum triunciale ssp. kotschyi (L.) Raspail (Boiss.) Asch. & Graebn.) is a member of the grass family, Poaceae, native to the Levant.

Elsewhere it can be a weed. This plant is known or likely to be susceptible to barley mild mosaic bymovirus.

References

 Brunt, A.A., Crabtree, K., Dallwitz, M.J., Gibbs, A.J., Watson, L. and Zurcher, E.J. (eds.)  (1996 onwards).  Barley mild mosaic bymovirus. Plant Viruses Online: Descriptions and Lists from the VIDE Database. Version: 20 August 1996.

External links
Aegilops kotschyi
GrainGenes Species Report: Aegilops kotschyi

kotschyi
Flora of Western Asia
Taxa named by Pierre Edmond Boissier